Hoka may refer to:
 Hoka (fish) or red codling, a fish found around southern Australia and New Zealand
 Hoka!, a 1983 collection of science fiction stories by Poul Anderson and Gordon Dickson
 Høka, a Norwegian vehicle bodywork company
 Hoka One One, or Hoka, a French athletic shoe company 
 Hoka, Myanmar, a place in Kyaukme Township
 HOKA, a 2016 album by Nahko and Medicine for the People

See also

Hoka Hoka Kazoku, Japanese anime television series